John Dair (3 March 1933 – 25 November 2005) was a Scottish actor who was best known for his role as Harry Grout’s bodyguard "Crusher" in the sitcom Porridge and as Charlie Dawson in the drama Our Friends in the North.

Although born in Dundee, Scotland, Dair was a resident of London, England, for many years.

He drove mobile cranes and bulldozers on building sites and then worked as a singer, until he was offered the part in Porridge whilst performing at the Lyceum Theatre, London. He appeared in one of the most memorable scenes in the sitcom in which his character displays a "sense of humour failure" when a joke is repeated to him. He also had small parts in films, the most memorable of which was in Batman as crime boss Vinnie Ricorso, who is fatally stabbed in the throat with a quill pen by the Joker.

In 1984 he appeared in the iconic music video for the Frankie Goes to Hollywood song Relax as a man dressed as a Roman emperor in a gay nightclub. He also appeared in commercials including the acclaimed 1985 advertisement for Levi Strauss & Co. jeans with Nick Kamen that was set in a Laundromat. Dair died of lung cancer in 2005.

Filmography

References

External links

1933 births
2005 deaths
Scottish male film actors
Scottish male television actors
Male actors from Dundee
Deaths from lung cancer in England